Lee Jun (born 14 July 1997) is a South Korean footballer currently playing as a goalkeeper for Gwangju FC.

Career statistics

Club

Notes

References

1997 births
Living people
Yonsei University alumni
South Korean footballers
South Korea youth international footballers
Association football goalkeepers
K League 1 players
K League 2 players
Pohang Steelers players
Gwangju FC players